Slush is the 1997 debut album by OP8, a band formed from Lisa Germano, Howe Gelb of Giant Sand, and Joey Burns and John Convertino of Calexico and Giant Sand. The album was released on Thirsty Ear and features covers of "Sand" by Nancy Sinatra and Lee Hazlewood as well as "Round and Round" by Neil Young.  Its generally mainstream, jazz-inflected songwriting is at times counterbalanced by odd sonic details, including detuned melodic fragments and synthetic noises.

Comedian and writer Stewart Lee has ranked Slush among his thirteen favourite albums of all time.

Track listing
 "Sand" (Lee Hazlewood) – 4:37
 "Lost In Space" (Joey Burns) – 4:07
 "If I Think Of Love" (Lisa Germano) – 3:15
 "Leather" (Howe Gelb) – 6:04
 "It's A Rainbow" (Germano) – 4:08
 "OP8" (Gelb/Convertino/Burns) – 4:45
 "Cracklin' Water" (Gelb) – 6:29
 "Never See It Coming" (Burns/Gelb) – 4:05
 "Tom, Dick & Harry" (Germano) – 4:20
 "The Devil Loves L.A." (Gelb) – 4:01
 "Round And Round" (Neil Young) – 6:21

The album was a critical success, and MTV invited the band to perform several of the songs from the album on their show MTV's Alternative Nation, in 1997. This gave Germano some much needed exposure, and "If I Think Of Love" became somewhat popular, and she released it on her next album, 1998's Slide.

References
 Sa-Wa-Ro Records Page

Notes

1997 debut albums
Thirsty Ear Recordings albums